Parliamentary elections were held in Slovenia on Sunday, 3 October 2004 to elect the 90 deputies of the National Assembly. A total of 1,390 male and female candidates ran in the election, organized into 155 lists. The lists were compiled both by official political parties and the groups of voters not registered as political parties. Five candidates applied for the seat of the representative of the Hungarian "national community" (as minorities are officially called in Slovenia) and only one candidate applied for the seat of the representative of the Italian national community. In the previous election (2000), fewer than 1000 candidates on 155 lists applied.

Electoral system

In Slovenia, elections in the National Assembly are held in eight voting units, each of which further divides into 11 districts. Different candidates apply in each of the eighty-eight districts. From each of eight units, 11 deputies get elected; however, not necessarily one deputy from each district (from some districts nobody gets elected, from others up to four candidates enter the parliament). Deputy's mandates are distributed at two levels: at the level of the voting unit and at the level of the state. In practice, at the level of voting units two thirds of mandates get allotted, while one third gets allotted at the level of the state. In this manner, 88 mandates get distributed. The remaining two seats are assigned to the representatives of the Italian and Hungarian minorities, which get elected separately (in the ninth and tenth voting units) by the  Borda count. Altogether, 90 deputies are elected in the parliament. The election threshold for a party to enter the parliament is four per cent.

List of parties and candidates participating in the elections 
[Candidates listed in bold were elected to the National Assembly.]

AS - Active Slovenia
DeSUS - Democratic Party of Slovenian Pensioners
Democratic Party of Slovenia
Women's Voice of Slovenia - GŽZ, Association for Primorsko - ZZP, Union of Independents of Slovenia - ZNS, New Democracy of Slovenia - NDS.
June List
LDS - Liberal Democracy of Slovenia
Advance, Slovenia
NSi - New Slovenia - Christian People's Party
SEG - Party of Ecological Movements
SJN - Slovenia is Ours
SDS - Slovenian Democratic Party
SNS - Slovenian National Party
SLS - Slovene People's Party
SMS - Youth Party of Slovenia
Social and Liberal Party
Party of the Slovenian Nation
The List for Enterprising Slovenia
ZLSD - United List of Social Democrats
The United for an Independent and Just Slovenia
Green Party of Slovenia
Marko Brecelj
Mihael Svanjak
Independent candidate Stefan Hudobivnik

The candidate for the representative of Italian minority:
 Roberto Battelli

The candidates for the representatives of Hungarian minority:
 Mária Pozsonec
 Jožef Kocon
 Franc Vida
 György Tomka
 Janez Bogdan

Results

Structure of the National Assembly 

The structure of parties was modified in April 2007, so the following roster is different from 2004. The list can change further, because some deputies can still be promoted to ministers.

Delegation of Slovenska demokratska stranka (SDS) [Slovenian Democratic Party]

Cukjati France
Černač Zvonko
Dobrajc Polonca
Grill Ivan
Grims Branko
Homan Bojan
Hrovat Robert
Hvauc Srečko
Irgl Eva
Jazbec Franc
Jeraj Alenka
Jerovšek Jožef
Kovačič Dimitrij
Krivec Danijel
Ljubeljšek Mitja
Marinič Branko
Pajk Stane
Petan Rudolf
Petek Miro
Pojbič Marijan
Pukšič Franc
Rugelj Bojan
Starman Bojan
Sušnik Franc
Štebe Tomaž
Tanko Jože
Veršnik Rudi
Zamernik Bogomir
Ziherl Milenko

Delegation of Socialni demokrati (SD) [United List of Social Democrats]

Bevk Samo
Cvikl Milan M.
Han Matjaž
Horvat Franc (Feri)
Juri Aurelio
Kontič Bojan
Kumer Dušan
Lavtižar Bebler Darja
Pavliha Marko
Pečan Breda
Potrata Majda
Potrč Miran
Rop Anton
Veber Janko

Delegation of Liberalna demokracija Slovenije (LDS) [Liberal Democracy of Slovenia]

Anderlič Anton
Džuban Geza
Germič Ljubo
Gulič Aleš
Jerič Miran
Moge Rudolf
Petek Milan
Sajovic Borut
Slavinec Mitja
Školč Jožef
Švagan Matjaž

Delegation of Nova Slovenija (NSi) [New Slovenia]

Drobnič Janez
Horvat Jožef
Kokalj Anton
Koren Drago
Kucler Dolinar Mojca
Mikolič Martin
Sok Alojz
Testen Ciril
Uhan Marjetka

Delegation of Slovenska ljudska stranka (SLS) [Slovenian People's Party]

Bajc Josip
Brenčič Stanislav
Drofenik Marjan
Janc Kristijan
Kramberger Janez
Presečnik Jakob
Prevc Mihael

Delegation of Nepovezani poslanci (NP) [Group of unaligned deputies]

Gantar Pavel
Lahovnik Matej
Posedel Alojz
Širca Majda
Terčon Davorin
Trofenik Vili
Zalokar Oražem Cvetka

Delegation of Slovenska nacionalna stranka (SNS) [Slovenian National Party]

Barovič Bogdan
Jelinčič Plemeniti Zmago
Peče Sašo
Prijatelj Srečko
Zagorac Boštjan
Žgajner Tavš Barbara

Delegation of Demokratična stranka upokojencev Slovenije (DeSUS) [Democratic Party of Pensioners of Slovenia]
Jelen Ivan
Klavora Vasja
Rezman Vili
Žnidaršič Franc

Delegation of Italijanska in madžarska narodna skupnost (NS) [Representatives of the Italian and Hungarian Minority]
Battelli Roberto
Pozsonec Mária

Nepovezani poslanec (NeP) [Unaligned deputy]
Gaber Slavko

Further reading 
 Toplak, Jurij. The parliamentary election in Slovenia, October 2004. Electoral Studies 25 (2006) 825-831.

References 
This article incorporates material translated from the corresponding article from the Slovenian Wikipedia, accessed on 14 April 2005.

External links 

 Republic of Slovenia, Elections for Deputies to the National Assembly

Parliamentary elections in Slovenia
Slovenia
2004 in Slovenia
October 2004 events in Europe